"Bye Bye Blues" may refer to:

"Bye Bye Blues" (song), a popular song
"Bye Bye Blues " (song) by Stela Cole, released in 2022
Bye Bye Blues (film), a 1989 Canadian film